Cypa latericia is a species of moth of the family Sphingidae. It is known from Thailand and Burma.

References

Cypa
Moths described in 1991